"Moonwalking in Calabasas" is a song by American rapper and YouTuber DDG. It was released on July 24, 2020, by Epic Records.

The music video first premiered on July 26, 2020 on his YouTube channel, and was shot by LewisYouNasty.

Background and composition 
The song is produced by DevIsLit and samples "Too Comfortable" by Future and interpolates "OD" by DDG.

The song goes in-depth about DDG's struggle to make a living by doing skits, and achieving success while doing YouTube as well as doing music. It also includes a diss towards rival YouTuber SoLLUMINATI.

Remix versions

Blueface remix 

A remix version featuring rapper Blueface was released on August 18, 2020. DDG and Blueface have been close after meeting at a venue in 2019, with the song marking their first collaboration together. Blueface shared the clip of the song in his Instagram, with DDG tweeting "I guess I’m finna drop the remix today" on August 18.

The music video was released on August 22 and amassed over 30 million views as of January 2021. It later ended up in his collaborative mixtape "Die 4 Respect" with OG Parker as the first single and bonus track.

YG remix 
On December 18, 2020, a second remix version with rapper YG was released, with YG giving two more verses. DDG thanked both Blueface and YG when the song charted on the Billboard Hot 100.

Charts

Weekly charts

Year-end charts

Certifications

References 

2020 singles
2020 songs
Blueface songs
YG (rapper) songs